Zolty Cracker was a Canadian band based out of Vancouver, British Columbia, Canada.  The band was named for lead vocalist and guitarist Gilles Zolty; the other members were Annie Wilkinson (bass, accordion, vocals, cello) and Wayne Adams (drums, percussion, harmonica, vocals).  Their music has been described by The Province as an "eccentric punk-folk hybrid", although their mix of styles includes punk, rock, thrash, funk, world beat, acoustic folk and traditional waltz.

History
Zolty Cracker formed in 1989. They began performing locally and later toured Canada, the United States and Europe.

In 1994 the band toured in Canada, including a performance in Montreal with the band Moist. The band's 1995 album Go Please Stay was financed on their own and independently released. The tracks received some radio airplay, and the music video "Driver" was played in rotation on MuchMusic.

In 1996 Zolty Cracker performed locally, including a set at the Vancouver Folk Festival. In 1997 the band stopped performing.

Others musicians who contributed to the band's performances were Michael Louw, Michael Venart, Jatinder Sandhu, Lara Kowalsky, Clint Rice, Jimmy Goodrich, Pierre Lumoncel, Marcel Hildebrand and Eric Napier.

Discography
Zolty Cracker (cassette, pre-1995)
Go Please Stay (1995)
Flush (1997)

References

External links 
 Zolty Cracker on Myspace
 Giles Zolty at CBC Radio 3

Musical groups established in 1989
Musical groups disestablished in 1997
Canadian folk rock groups
Musical groups from Vancouver
1989 establishments in British Columbia
1997 disestablishments in British Columbia